Andijon is an urban-type settlement of Buloqboshi District in Andijan Region, Uzbekistan. The town population in 1989 was 4,549 people, and 12,200 in 2016.

References

Populated places in Andijan Region
Urban-type settlements in Uzbekistan